The 1992 Nigerian Senate election in Plateau State was held on July 4, 1992, to elect members of the Nigerian Senate to represent Plateau State. Jacon Isandu representing Plateau North, V. K. Dangin representing Plateau East and Emmanuel Elaro representing Plateau West all won on the platform of the Social Democratic Party.

Overview

Summary

Results

Plateau North 
The election was won by Jacon Isandu of the Social Democratic Party.

Plateau East 
The election was won by V. K. Dangin of the Social Democratic Party.

Plateau West 
The election was won by Emmanuel Elaro of the Social Democratic Party.

References 

Pla
Plateau State Senate elections
July 1992 events in Nigeria